Saumarez was a community in Gloucester County, New Brunswick.  It is now a part of the Regional Municipality of Grand Tracadie–Sheila in Canada.

History

Notable people

See also
List of communities in New Brunswick

References

Designated places in New Brunswick
Former municipalities in New Brunswick
Neighbourhoods in Grand Tracadie-Sheila